ENO (essentially non-oscillatory) methods are classes of high-resolution schemes in numerical solution of differential equations.

History 
The first ENO scheme was developed by Harten, Engquist, Osher and Chakravarthy in 1987. In 1994, the first weighted version of ENO was developed.

See also
High-resolution scheme
WENO methods
Shock-capturing method

References

Numerical differential equations
Computational fluid dynamics